Brownsville station is a Metrorail station in Brownsville, Florida. It is located at the intersection of Northwest 27th Avenue (SR 9) and 52nd Street, opening to service May 19, 1985.

Station layout

Places of interest
Brownsville
Joseph Caleb Community Center
Family Health Center
Brownsville Renaissance (Retail shops, Movie theater)
Historic Hampton House Hotel

Brownsville Transit Village
Adjacent to the Brownsville Metrorail station is the construction of a new housing project, "Brownsville Transit Village." The project is composed of 5 mid-rise residential towers (467 apartments) with ground floor retail. The buildings are considered transit-oriented development, and are being designed around the metro station. The project was completed by 2012. However, as of 2016, Brownsville and Santa Clara (Santa Clara Apartments TOD), are the lowest ridership stations in the system.

References

External links
MDT – Metrorail Stations
 Station from Google Maps Street View

Green Line (Metrorail)
Metrorail (Miami-Dade County) stations in Miami-Dade County, Florida
Railway stations in the United States opened in 1985
1985 establishments in Florida